The 2018 SMP F4 Championship was the fourth season of the SMP F4 Championship. The series is also known as the FIA North-European Zone (NEZ) championship. Koiranen GP, despite creating Formula Academy Finland, continued as the promoter. The season started in Smolensk Ring on 5 May and finished in Assen Circuit on 21 October. 

Champion Konsta Lappalainen won seven races, with runner-up Michael Belov and third-placed Isac Blomqvist taking five and three victories respectively.

Drivers

Race calendar
On 27 April 2018 the calendar was announced. For the first time of the existence of the championship Sochi Autodrom hadn't received a slot in the schedule. Circuit Zandvoort was replaced with a round at the Assen Circuit, whilst Autodrom Moscow and NRING Circuit were included to the calendar for the first time. Round 6 was originally scheduled to be held at Auto24ring on 15–16 September, but was rescheduled to take place at Alastaro Circuit on 22–23 September.

Championship standings

Points were awarded to the top 10 classified finishers in each race. No points were awarded for pole position or fastest lap.

Drivers' championship

Notes:
† — Drivers did not finish the race, but were classified as they completed over 75% of the race distance.

Footnotes

References

External links

SMP F4 Championship seasons
SMP F4 Championship
SMP F4 Championship
SMP F4
SMP F4